Alberg is a surname. Notable people with the surname include:

Carl Alberg (1900–1986), ship engineer and sailboat constructor
Ifrish Alberg (born 1988), Surinamese sprinter
Petur Alberg (1885–1940), Faroese violinist, composer, and author
Roland Alberg (born 1990), Dutch footballer
Tom Alberg (born 1940), American lawyer and businessman